Funny Pets is a Japanese digital computer (CGI) anime series created and directed by Ryuji Masuda that was made in 2006.

The sound effects were made by Shizuo Kurahashi.

Plot 
The plot of the series is that a UFO carrying two aliens from another planet ends up falling into Earth, where they are saved by a moody air-headed showgirl called Funny (ファニー). The two aliens, the moon-like Crescent (クレセント) and the sun-like Corona (コロナ), must adjust to life as Funny's pets. There are 24 episodes and two seasons in this series, all of which are available on YouTube and NicoNico Douga, a Japanese video sharing website.

Characters 
 Funny (ファニー)
 Corona (コロナ)
 Crescent (クレセント)
 Horley (ホーリーとその家族)

Staff 
 Director - Ryuji Masuda
 Character Design and Art Settings - Wakako Masuda
 Music - Meynable Co.
 Sound Design - Hiroshi Nakano
 Sound Effects - Shizuo Kurahashi
 CG Director - Takayuki Ito
 CG Designers - Akio Koizumi, Reiko Muto, Yoshiaki Higa, Taeko Kawagoe
 VFX - Kohei Yamamoto
 Producer - Shunsuke Koga
 Production - Funny Pets Production Committee (RumbleFish, tvk, KBSKyoto, Rent-Track Japan, S1-T3CG)

Reception
Anime-Planet: The anime received overwhelmingly negative reviews on review site Anime-Planet, criticizing the show for its violent and nonsensical plots, simplistic 3D animation and unlikable characters (first season note: 1,068/5 - second season note: 1,059/5)

OST (soundtrack) 
The music is composed and mixed by Meyna Co, who also created the soundtrack for another of Masuda's shows called Ga-Ra-Ku-Ta: Mr. Stain On Junk Alley.

 Tracks:
 Opening (Lyrical)
 Title 1
 Candy
 Crescent Blues
 Funny
 Title 2
 Hunting
 Idea
 Arrows
 Candy 2
 Title 3
 Candy 3
 Crescent Blues 2
 Cabbage
 Title 4
 Candy 4
 Fear
 Candy 5
 Ghost
 Spanked
 Whale
 Picture Book
 Anger
 Showdown
 Walking The Rainbow
 Driving To The Rainbow
 Rainbow
 Flight
 Too High
 Inflated
 Ascension
 Birthday (Short Version)
 Crescent Blues
 Birthday (Long Version)
 Title 5
 Three Matches
 The Last Match
 Orbit
 Title 6
 Out Of Frame
 Canon
 Title 7
 Danger
 Candy 6
 Circle
 Crescent Blues 4
 Title 8
 Love
 Admiration
 Guitar
 Forced Dancing
 Kiss
 Heartbreak
 Title 9
 Guitar 2
 The Favor Is Repaid
 Guitar 3
 Title 10
 Frog’s Song (Vocals Only)
 Frog’s Song (Instrumental)
 Frog’s Song (Complete)
 Frog’s Song (Distorted)
 Music Notes
 Frog’s Song (Music Notes)
 Frog’s Song (Music Notes) (Complete)
 Title 11
 Cloud Pets
 Evil And Just
 Evil’s Theme
 Just’s Theme
 Candy 7
 Title 12
 At The Ocean
 Hiding The Evidence
 Title 13
 Discovered
 Grief
 Goldfish
 Dead Goldfish
 Haunted
 Book Thrower
 Candy 8
 Forbidden Game
 Graveyard Dance
 Title 14
 Crescent Blues 5
 Star’s Song
 Crescent War
 Chocolate Fight (Short Version)
 Chocolate Thieves
 Chocolate Trance
 Chocolate Fight (Long Version)
 Candy 9
 Back To The Home
 Back To Funny
 Candy 10
 Opening (Instrumental)

Related 
 Popee the Performer 
 Ryuji Masuda
 Ga-Ra-Ku-Ta: Mr. Stain On Junk Alley

References

External links
 
 Funny Pets Official Site - Closed (Archives as of July 3, 2006).

Japanese children's animated comic science fiction television series
Japanese computer-animated television series
Dark comedy anime and manga